CAIS may refer to:

Organisations
 Canadian Academy of Independent Scholars
 Canadian Accredited Independent Schools
 Canadian Association for Information Science
 Canadian Association for Irish Studies
 Capitol Area Internet Service, an early ISP servicing the Washington, DC area until 2001; See Erol's Internet
 Changchun American International School
 Christian Alliance International School
 Chinese American International School

Other uses
 Chemical Agent Identification Set
 Communications of the Association for Information Systems, an academic journal; See the founding editor Paul Gray
 Complete androgen insensitivity syndrome
 Cais (surname)

See also
 Central American Integration System (Sistema de la Integración Centroamericana, or SICA)
 CAI (disambiguation)
 Calcium–aluminium-rich inclusion (CAI)